The 1974 Coupe de France Final was a football match held at Parc des Princes, Paris, on 8 June 1974 that saw AS Saint-Étienne defeat AS Monaco FC 2–1 thanks to goals by Christian Synaeghel and Alain Merchadier.

Match details

See also
1973–74 Coupe de France

External links
Coupe de France results at Rec.Sport.Soccer Statistics Foundation
Report on French federation site

Coupe
1974
Coupe De France Final 1974
Coupe De France Final 1974
Coupe de France Final
Coupe de France Final